Super Typhoon Kate, known in the Philippines as Typhoon Titang, was the second of two super typhoons to strike the Philippines within a week in October 1970, the first being Super Typhoon Joan. As a result, Kate produced heavy damage and over 631 casualties. At the time, Kate was one of the deadliest typhoons to strike the Philippines.

Meteorological history

Super Typhoon Kate was first identified by the Joint Typhoon Warning Center (JTWC) on October 7, 1970, and by the Japan Meteorological Agency on October 9, 1970 as a tropical disturbance near the Marshall Islands. The system tracked in a general westward direction and relocated itself further south during this period in response to Typhoon Joan wake to the northwest. By October 13, convection sharply increased as the system entered a region of strong diffluence. The following day, the disturbance featured a marked increase in organization as thunderstorms continued to consolidate around the center of circulation. During the afternoon of October 15, reconnaissance aircraft reached the storm and reported that it was already nearing typhoon status. Sustained winds were measured at  along with a barometric pressure of 985 mbar (hPa; 29.12 inHg). At this time cyclone storm was classified as Tropical Storm Kate, the 18th named storm of the 1970 season. Additionally, the storm had begun developing an eyewall, an indication that the system was likely to intensify further. Over the following three days, the storm continued its westward track while gaining strength.

Throughout the day on October 16, Kate underwent a period of rapid intensification. Early on October 17, reconnaissance planes flown into the typhoon measured the eye to be  in diameter. Although winds were still increasing, the lowest pressure recorded in relation to Kate was measured at this time at 940 mbar (hPa; 27.7 inHg). As the typhoon neared the southeastern Philippine island of Mindanao on October 18, it further intensified.

Due to the interaction with the mountainous terrain of the Philippines, Kate quickly weakened as it moved northwestward across the archipelago. By October 19, the system had weakened to a tropical storm, less than 24 hours after attaining its peak winds. Despite the notable weakening, the structure of the storm remained relatively intact as it moved over the Sulu Sea. Throughout the day, the system briefly sped up before rapidly slowing near the South China Sea. On October 20, decreased interaction with land allowed Kate to re-attain typhoon status just before passing over Busuanga Island. Continuing its northwest track, the typhoon slowly intensified and redeveloped a 37 mi (23 mi) wide eye. Late on October 21, the JTWC assessed the storm to have re-attained Category 4 intensity; however, post-storm analysis indicated that sustained winds did not exceed . The following day, a ridge to the north of Kate prevented the system from tracking further north and prompted a west-southwestward track.

Gradual weakening took place over the following several days as Kate slowly neared the Indochina coastline. By October 24, winds had decreased below  and the eye became asymmetrical and partially open in the northeast quadrant. On October 25, the typhoon further weakened to a tropical storm just off the coast of Vietnam. Rapid weakening ensued as Kate moved over the high terrain of southwest Asia, with the storm degrading to a tropical depression within six hours of moving inland. The system dissipated within the next 24 hours as it moved over the plateau region of Cambodia.
Both JTWC and JMA released their final advisories as Kate dissipated over Vietnam.

Impact

Philippines
In southern Mindanao, over 5,000 houses and other such structures were damaged or destroyed by storm surge, heavy rains and strong winds produced by Typhoon Kate. Damage from the storm was estimated at $50 million, making it one of the costliest typhoons on record at the time. A total of 631 people were confirmed to have been killed by the storm and 284 others were listed as missing, ranking Kate as one of the deadliest typhoons to strike the Philippines at the time. An American newspaper, The Lewiston Daily Sun (now known as the Sun Journal) incorrectly dubbed Kate as the deadliest typhoon to ever hit the Philippines; however, typhoons Amy and Trix in the early 1950s had higher death tolls compared to Kate (991 and 995 respectively), while the 1881 Haiphong typhoon was believed to have killed 20,000 people in the Philippines. The newspaper also erroneously mentioned that the previous deadliest typhoon was a storm in the 1960s which killed 200 people in Manila – possibly referring to either Tropical Storm Lucille in 1960 or Typhoon Winnie in 1964. The large loss of life from the typhoon is thought to be related to the lack of tropical cyclone experience for residents in southern Mindanao. It was only 42 years later that another major typhoon, Typhoon Bopha, made landfall in southeastern Mindanao.

Initial reports from the Red Cross indicated that at least 150 homes were destroyed within hours of Kate's landfall. Telecommunication was lost to much of the region as power lines were felled by high winds. Within a day of the storm's passage, the death toll had reached 13 with 29 others missing and was expected to increase.

Vietnam
Due to the threat of the typhoon, United States military officials prompted the evacuation of a military hospital near Da Nang and the relocation of aircraft. The level of fighting during Kate's passage was regarded as one of the lowest during the Vietnam War as most tactical bombing missions were canceled. During the 24 hours in which the storm affected Vietnam, the United States launched 46 air bombings, the fewest in over two years. Roughly 900 people were evacuated the first day after Kate by Marine Aircraft Group 16, and over 9,000 South Vietnamese were rescued by the 1st Marine Aircraft Wing, in Vietnam to fight the Vietnam War.

See also

 Tropical cyclone
 List of tropical cyclones
 List of Equatorial tropical cyclones
 1970 Pacific typhoon season
 Typhoon Bopha

References

1970 Pacific typhoon season
Typhoons in the Philippines
Typhoons in Vietnam
Typhoon Kate
Typhoons
Retired Philippine typhoon names
History of Da Nang
History of Quảng Nam province